Ong Kiat Guan (c. 1930 – 4 December 1983) was a Singaporean basketball player. He competed in the men's tournament at the 1956 Summer Olympics.

References

External links
 
 

1983 deaths
Singaporean men's basketball players
Olympic basketball players of Singapore
Basketball players at the 1956 Summer Olympics
Singaporean sportspeople of Chinese descent
Place of birth missing
Year of birth uncertain